Acanthobasiliola is a monotypic genus of brachiopods belonging to the family Basiliolidae. The only species is Acanthobasiliola doederleini.

The species is found in Malesia.

References

Rhynchonellida
Brachiopod genera
Monotypic brachiopod genera